Peter de Lange (23 March 1988) is a Dutch association football player in the position forward. He is a resident of Rotterdam.

Club career
De Lange played in Barendrecht, Willem II, SBV Excelsior, Barendrecht, VV Capelle, and Spakenburg.

From 2016 to 2018 he played in ASWH in the Derde Divisie. In his first season at ASWH he was their top scorer and third overall in the Derde Divisie (after leading the ranks into winter break). He continued to VV Spijkenisse and to BVV Barendrecht for a second run.

References

1988 births
Living people
ASWH players
Excelsior Rotterdam players
Willem II (football club) players
Footballers from Rotterdam
Association football forwards
Dutch footballers
BVV Barendrecht players
VV Spijkenisse players